Choice of Russia:

 Choice of Russia (electoral bloc), a bloc founded in 1993 and headed by Prime Minister Yegor Gaidar
 Democratic Choice of Russia, a political party
 Democratic Choice of Russia – United Democrats, a bloc founded before Russian legislative election of 1995
 Choice of Russia (parliamentary group), a liberal political group of State Duma in 1993-1996 headed by Yegor Gaidar
 Choice of Russia (political movement), an organization founded in 1993 and headed by Vladimir Ryzhkov

See also 
 Democratic Party of Russia
 Democratic Russia